The Gustav Bull Mountains are a small group of bare, rugged mountain peaks and nunataks, lying  inland from the coast and  southwest of Scullin Monolith in Mac. Robertson Land, Antarctica. In January and February 1931 several Norwegian whale catchers, exploring this coast, made sketches of the land from their vessels and named this group the Gustav Bull Mountains for Captain Gustav B. Bull, at that time whaling manager of the Thorshammer. The British Australian New Zealand Antarctic Research Expedition (1929–31), under Douglas Mawson, made an airplane flight over this area in January 1930, returning for further exploration in February 1931, and giving names to individual features in the group.

References

Mountain ranges of Mac. Robertson Land